Unna Nenachen Pattu Padichen is a 1992 Indian Tamil-language drama film written and directed by Guru Dhanapal. The film stars Karthik, Sasikala and Monisha. It was released on 12 April 1992.

Plot 

Muthurasu and Periyasamy are brothers, and live with their father and their grandmother. Meenakshi, Muthurasu's cousin, will marry another man but she must marry Muthurasu or Periyasamy as per the customs. The brothers then decide to kidnap Meenakshi. In the process, Periyasamy dies. The two villages then clash and arrange a panchayat to solve the problem.

During the panchayat, Meenakshi says that she will stay in her uncle's house because Meenakshi hates the groom. Muthurasu's father decides to arrange the marriage between Muthurasu and Meenakshi but Muthurasu cannot forget his lover Dhanam who died a few years ago. What transpires later forms the crux of the story.

Cast 

Karthik as Muthurasu
Sasikala as Meenakshi
Monisha as Dhanam
Nizhalgal Ravi as Periyasamy
Anandaraj
Janagaraj
Rajesh
Senthil as Kuppusamy
Vinu Chakravarthy
Vijayan as Rathnasamy, Meenakshi's father
Kanthimathi
P. R. Varalakshmi as Chinna Thayi, Dhanam's mother
Vijaya Chandrika as Meenakshi's mother
Kovai Sarala as Shanthi
Tiruppur Ramasamy
A. K. Veerasamy as Poosari
Karuppu Subbiah
Periya Karuppu Thevar
Azhagu

Soundtrack 
The music was composed by Ilaiyaraaja, with lyrics written by Vaali, Gangai Amaran, Piraisoodan and Ponnadiyan. The song in the film "Ennai Thottu Alli Konda" has a cult following in Tamil Nadu.

Reception
Sundarji of Kalki felt only first 13 minutes of the film were interesting, and the film later became boring.

References

External links 

1992 films
Indian drama films
1992 drama films
Films scored by Ilaiyaraaja
1990s Tamil-language films
Films directed by Guru Dhanapal